Elite League may refer to:

 Elite League (speedway), British motorcycle speedway competition
 Under 20 Elite League, an international association football tournament introduced in 2017.
 French Rugby League Elite One Championship and Elite Two Championship
 Elite Ice Hockey League, the highest level of ice hockey competition in the United Kingdom
 Eliteserien (disambiguation), the name of the top-tier league in many sports in Norway
 Elitserien (disambiguation), the name of the top-tier league in many sports in Sweden
 Swedish Hockey League, the highest level ice hockey league in Sweden, called Elitserien 1975–2013, known in English as the Swedish Elite League
 Sahara Elite League, Kenyan cricket competition
 Elite League (India), Indian Under-18 association football league

See also

 Super League (disambiguation)
 League (disambiguation)